Mahogany Bluff is a rocky bluff  southwest of Cape Gordon, forming the east side of Pastorizo Bay, on Vega Island, Antarctica. It was so named by the UK Antarctic Place-Names Committee because of the striking deep red-brown color of the bluff, reminiscent of mahogany wood.

References

Cliffs of the James Ross Island group